Uemoto (written: 上本) is a Japanese surname. Notable people with the surname include:

, Japanese baseball player
, Japanese footballer
, Japanese baseball player
, Japanese baseball player

Japanese-language surnames